The Harvard Review of Philosophy is an annual peer-reviewed  academic journal of philosophy edited by a student collective at Harvard University. Established in 1991, it publishes articles, reviews, and interviews with living philosophers. The journal is published annually by the Philosophy Documentation Center.

Notable authors include Roderick Chisholm, Jaakko Hintikka, Martha C. Nussbaum, Derek Parfit, and Judith Jarvis Thomson. The journal has published interviews with notable scholars such as Cornel West, Bernard Williams, Umberto Eco, Stanley Cavell, Hilary Putnam, Richard Rorty, and Willard Van Orman Quine. The first issue included an interview with John Rawls, one of the few he ever gave.

Three books of collected articles from the journal have been published, one containing a selection of interviews and the others containing philosophical essays:
Philosophers in Conversation: Interviews from The Harvard Review of Philosophy (2002)
The Space of Love and Garbage: And Other Essays from The Harvard Review of Philosophy (2008)
All We Need Is a Paradigm: Essays on Science, Economics, and Logic from The Harvard Review of Philosophy (2009)

The Hardest Logic Puzzle Ever was published in the 1996 issue.

See also
List of philosophy journals

References

External links

Philosophy journals
Annual journals
Publications established in 1991
English-language journals
Harvard University
1991 establishments in Massachusetts
Philosophy Documentation Center academic journals